Dirk Johannes Hermann (born 13 January 1972) is a South African labor executive. He serves as chief executive officer of Solidarity, an Afrikaans union that operates in South Africa. He is an author and director.

Personal life

Hermann is the son of Marthinus Nicolaas Hermann and Moira Crafford. His is a descendant from the 1820 British settler, James Herman. Later descendants added a second "n" to the surname. He married Elsha Cornelia Coetzer with whom he has four daughters.

He studied at North-West University where he earned a Baccalaureus Artium (Law), Honours Baccalaureus Artium(Labour Relations), Magister Artium(Industrial sociology), and PhD (2006). The theme was affirmative action.

Career
He served as trustee for Takbok trust. He was a director at Akademia.  He served as vice-president of the Convocation (made up by graduates from the university) of North-West University. He served as chief executive officer for Solidarity Trade Union.

Publications

 The naked emperor: Why affirmative action has failed 
 Affirmative tears: Why representivity does not equal equality
 Basta! Ons voetspore is in Afrika

 Land of sorrow: 20 years of farm attacks in South Africa

References 

South African trade unionists
Afrikaans-language writers
1972 births
Living people
Corporate directors